George Dalton Libby (4 December 1919 – 20 July 1950) was a soldier in the United States Army during the Korean War. He posthumously received the Medal of Honor for his actions on July 20, 1950.

Serving with the 24th Infantry Division, Sergeant Libby was attempting to withdraw from Taejon after the Battle of Taejon when the truck he was riding in was disabled by North Korean fire. Libby exposed himself to enemy fire multiple times to help wounded soldiers, before using himself as a human shield to protect the driver of another truck as they broke through the North Korean forces. Shot multiple times, Libby died from blood loss, but was able to protect a truck full of wounded men until they escaped to allied lines. For this action, Libby was awarded the Medal of Honor.

Biography 

George Dalton Libby was born on 4 December 1919 in Bridgton, Maine. He enlisted in the United States Army in Waterbury, Connecticut.

Libby fought in World War II in the European Theatre of Operations.

By the time of the outbreak of the Korean War, Libby was a sergeant and had been assigned to C Company of the 3rd Engineer Battalion, 24th Infantry Division.

Medal of Honor action 
On 20 July 1950, the 24th Infantry Division was attempting to withdraw from the city of Taejon, South Korea, after having been badly beaten by the North Korean Korean People's Army (KPA) in the Battle of Taejon. By nightfall, the last remaining elements of the division were attempting to leave the town for Taegu. Libby was aboard a truck to the east of town attempting to evacuate when it reached a KPA roadblock. The KPA there ambushed the truck, disabling it and killing or wounding everyone aboard except Libby with gunfire.

Libby disembarked from the damaged truck, taking cover in a ditch and returning fire. During this fight, Libby twice exposed himself to fire to run across the road to assist other wounded soldiers. After rendering medical aid to the wounded, and pulling them out of the line of fire, Libby then stopped a passing M5 Half-track which was towing a 105 mm howitzer and loaded them onto it. Libby then took a position on the outside of the truck, protecting the driver with his own body and again exposing himself to fire, as he was the only unwounded soldier capable of carrying a weapon,

Having the vehicle stop several times to load more wounded onto it, Libby continued to fire his M2 Carbine at the KPA they encountered as they attempted to escape. Libby was struck several times in the body and arms by bullets as they broke through the first roadblock. At a second roadblock, Libby was struck again by  gunfire. Too weak to hold his weapon, Libby pulled himself to an erect position in order to be a human shield for the driver until they were out of the range of enemy fire. Libby eventually collapsed and died from blood loss, but his actions allowed the truck full of wounded men to reach safety.

On 2 August 1951, the Army awarded the Medal of Honor to Libby posthumously. Later, on 4 July 1953, a bridge across the Imjin River in South Korea was dedicated to Libby.

Awards and decorations 
Libby's awards and decorations include:

Medal of honor citation 
Libby was one of the first two soldiers to be awarded the Medal of Honor during the Korean war, the other being 24th Infantry Division commander Major General William F. Dean, who was captured in the same evacuation.

See also

List of Medal of Honor recipients
List of Korean War Medal of Honor recipients

References

Notes

Citations

Sources 

1919 births
1950 deaths
United States Army Medal of Honor recipients
American military personnel killed in the Korean War
People from Bridgton, Maine
Burials at Arlington National Cemetery
Korean War recipients of the Medal of Honor
Military personnel from Connecticut
United States Army personnel of World War II
United States Army personnel of the Korean War
United States Army non-commissioned officers